The Freeloaders were an English house music duo formed in 2004 by Kevin O'Toole and Dale Longworth, the founder members of N-Trance.

Under this alias they released a UK Top 10 single, "So Much Love to Give", which sampled The Real Thing; and an album Freshly Squeezed. Other musicians involved with the Freeloaders were Jerome Stokes and Vinny Burns.

Discography

Albums

Singles

Music videos

Remixes

See also
N-Trance

References

External links
 Official homepage

English house music duos
Musical groups from the Metropolitan Borough of Oldham
Musical groups established in 2004
2004 establishments in England